Noyelles-sur-Selle (literally Noyelles on Selle) is a commune in the Nord department in northern France.

Heraldry

Notable people from Noyelles
 Francisco Luis Héctor de Carondelet, colonial governor for the Spanish Empire

See also
Communes of the Nord department

References

Noyellessurselle